Sound of Heaven is the first extended play by Tom Smith. He released the EP on 6 July 2015. Smith worked with Martin Smith, in the production of this EP.

Critical reception

Awarding the EP four stars at Worship Leader, Jeremy Armstrong writes, "Plenty of worship releases these days have semblances of EDM/dubstep. But is a semblance enough? Sound of Heaven says absolutely not." Derek Walker, rating the album three and a half out of five for The Phantom Tollbooth, states, "Worship music does have a future after all...This one shows the way with colour, energy and soaring production." Giving the album five stars from Louder Than the Music, describes, "Once you take away all the big sounds, the creative music, we are left with the most important aspect of any worship album, the lyrics...Tom hasn't just used the same old clichéd lyrics and the same old melodies with the same old bridge section, Tom has written honestly yet poetically and passionately."

Track listing

References

2015 EPs